Hermann "Stift" Höfer (19 July 1934 – 22 October 1996) was a German football player who played his entire career for Eintracht Frankfurt.

Höfer joined the Frankfurt side as a 15-year-old and debuted in 1953. Until 1966, the defender gathered over 300 appearances. Wearing the Eintracht jersey he won the German championship in 1959. He also played at the 1956 Summer Olympics.

From 1963 until 1966 he played 68 times in the new founded Bundesliga. In the 1981–82 season, he was vice president of the Eagles.

Honours 
 German championship: 1958–59
 European Cup: runners-up 1959–60
 Oberliga Süd: 1958–59; runners-up 1953–54, 1960–61, 1961–62
 DFB-Pokal: runners-up 1963–64
 UEFA Intertoto Cup: 1966–67

References

External links 
 Hermann Höfer at eintracht-archiv.de 

1934 births
1996 deaths
German footballers
Eintracht Frankfurt players
Bundesliga players
Footballers at the 1956 Summer Olympics
Olympic footballers of the United Team of Germany
Eintracht Frankfurt non-playing staff
Association football defenders
Footballers from Frankfurt
West German footballers